Presidential elections were held in the Maldives on 1 October 1993. Maumoon Abdul Gayoom was the sole candidate nominated by Parliament. His candidacy was approved by 92.8% of voters.

Results

References

Maldives
1993 in the Maldives
Presidential elections in the Maldives
Single-candidate elections
October 1993 events in Asia
Election and referendum articles with incomplete results